
Gmina Nowa Karczma is a rural gmina (administrative district) in Kościerzyna County, Pomeranian Voivodeship, in northern Poland.

The gmina contains part of the protected area called Kashubian Landscape Park.

Villages
Gmina Nowa Karczma contains the villages and settlements of Będomin, Grabówko, Grabowo Kościerskie, Grabowska Huta, Guzy, Horniki, Horniki Dolne, Horniki Górne, Jasionowa Huta, Jasiowa Huta, Kamionki, Liniewko Kościerskie, Lubań, Lubieszynek, Nowa Karczma, Nowe Horniki, Nowy Barkoczyn, Olszowy Kiesz, Rekownica, Skrzydłówko, Skrzydłowo, Śledziowa Huta, Stary Barkoczyn, Szatarpy, Szpon, Sztofrowa Huta, Szumleś Królewski, Szumleś Szlachecki, Wielki Kamień, Zielona Wieś and Zimne Zdroje.

Neighbouring gminas
Gmina Nowa Karczma is bordered by the gminas of Kościerzyna, Liniewo, Przywidz, Skarszewy and Somonino.

References
 Polish official population figures 2006

Nowa Karczma
Kościerzyna County